Romsdalshornet is a mountain in the municipality of Rauma in Møre og Romsdal county, Norway. The Rauma railway line and the European route E136 highway both pass by the mountain.

Romsdalshornet is a popular mountain for climbing, which is best done in late summer. Descent by rappel is recommended.

History
The first "official" ascent was 1 September 1881 by the Danish climber, Carl Hall, together with Norwegians, Erik Norahagen and Mathias Soggemoen. They arrived only to discover a cairn set up by Christen Smed and Hans Bjermeland around 1828.  Previously none believed Romsdalshornet had really summitted until Hall discovered their cairn.

Arne Randers Heen made the first winter ascent of Romsdalshorn in 1930.

See also
List of mountains of Norway

References

External links
 Romsdalshorn.com

Mountains of Møre og Romsdal
Rauma, Norway